In physics, Hamilton's principle is William Rowan Hamilton's formulation of the principle of stationary action. It states that the dynamics of a physical system are determined by a variational problem for a functional based on a single function, the Lagrangian, which may contain all physical information concerning the system and the forces acting on it. The variational problem is equivalent to and allows for the derivation of the differential equations of motion of the physical system.  Although formulated originally for classical mechanics, Hamilton's principle also applies to classical fields such as the electromagnetic and gravitational fields, and plays an important role in quantum mechanics, quantum field theory and criticality theories.

Mathematical formulation

where  is the Lagrangian function for the system. The action  is a functional, i.e., something that takes as its input a function and returns a single number, a scalar. In terms of functional analysis, Hamilton's principle states that the true evolution of a physical system is a solution of the functional equation

That is, the system takes a path in configuration space for which the action is stationary, with fixed boundary conditions at the beginning and the end of the path.

Euler–Lagrange equations derived from the action integral
See also more rigorous derivation Euler–Lagrange equation

To first order in the perturbation , the change in the action functional  would be

where we have expanded the Lagrangian L to first order in the perturbation .

Applying integration by parts to the last term results in

The boundary conditions  causes the first term to vanish

Hamilton's principle requires that this first-order change  is zero for all possible perturbations , i.e., the true path is a stationary point of the action functional  (either a minimum, maximum or saddle point).  This requirement can be satisfied if and only if

These equations are called the Euler–Lagrange equations for the variational problem.

Canonical momenta and constants of motion

The conjugate momentum  for a generalized coordinate  is defined by the equation

An important special case of the Euler–Lagrange equation occurs when L does not contain a generalized coordinate  explicitly,

that is, the conjugate momentum is a constant of the motion.

In such cases, the coordinate  is called a cyclic coordinate.

Example: Free particle in polar coordinates

Trivial examples help to appreciate the use of the action principle via the Euler–Lagrange equations. A free particle (mass m and velocity v) in Euclidean space moves in a straight line. Using the Euler–Lagrange equations, this can be shown in polar coordinates as follows. In the absence of a potential, the Lagrangian is simply equal to the kinetic energy 

in orthonormal (x,y) coordinates, where the dot represents differentiation with respect to the curve parameter (usually the time, t). Therefore, upon application of the Euler–Lagrange equations,

And likewise for y. Thus the Euler–Lagrange formulation can be used to derive Newton's laws.

In polar coordinates  the kinetic energy and hence the Lagrangian becomes

The radial  and  components of the Euler–Lagrange equations become, respectively

remembering that r is also dependent on time and the product rule is needed to compute the total time derivative .

The solution of these two equations is given by

Applied to deformable bodies
Hamilton's principle is an important variational principle in elastodynamics. As opposed to a system composed of rigid bodies, deformable bodies have an infinite number of degrees of freedom and occupy continuous regions of space; consequently, the state of the system is described by using continuous functions of space and time. The extended Hamilton Principle for such bodies is given by

If the system is conservative, the work done by external forces may be derived from a scalar potential . In this case,

This is called Hamilton's principle and it is invariant under coordinate transformations.

Comparison with Maupertuis' principle

Hamilton's principle and Maupertuis' principle are occasionally confused and both have been called (incorrectly) the principle of least action.  They differ in three important ways: 
 their definition of the action... Maupertuis' principle uses an integral over the generalized coordinates known as the abbreviated action or reduced action  where p = (p1, p2, ..., pN) are the conjugate momenta defined above.  By contrast, Hamilton's principle uses , the integral of the Lagrangian over time.
the solution that they determine...  Hamilton's principle determines the trajectory q(t) as a function of time, whereas Maupertuis' principle determines only the shape of the trajectory in the generalized coordinates.  For example, Maupertuis' principle determines the shape of the ellipse on which a particle moves under the influence of an inverse-square central force such as gravity, but does not describe per se how the particle moves along that trajectory.  (However, this time parameterization may be determined from the trajectory itself in subsequent calculations using the conservation of energy).  By contrast, Hamilton's principle directly specifies the motion along the ellipse as a function of time.
...and the constraints on the variation. Maupertuis' principle requires that the two endpoint states q1 and q2 be given and that energy be conserved along every trajectory (same energy for each trajectory). This forces the endpoint times to be varied as well. By contrast, Hamilton's principle does not require the conservation of energy, but does require that the endpoint times t1 and t2 be specified as well as the endpoint states q1 and q2.

Action principle for fields

Classical field theory

The action principle can be extended to obtain the equations of motion for fields, such as the electromagnetic field or gravity.

The Einstein equation utilizes the Einstein–Hilbert action as constrained by a variational principle.

The path of a body in a gravitational field (i.e. free fall in space time, a so-called geodesic) can be found using the action principle.

Quantum mechanics and quantum field theory

In quantum mechanics, the system does not follow a single path whose action is stationary, but the behavior of the system depends on all imaginable paths and the value of their action. The action corresponding to the various paths is used to calculate the path integral, that gives the probability amplitudes of the various outcomes.

Although equivalent in classical mechanics with Newton's laws, the action principle is better suited for generalizations and plays an important role in modern physics.  Indeed, this principle is one of the great generalizations in physical science. In particular, it is fully appreciated and best understood within quantum mechanics. Richard Feynman's path integral formulation of quantum mechanics is based on a stationary-action principle, using path integrals. Maxwell's equations can be derived as conditions of stationary action.

See also

Analytical mechanics
Configuration space
Hamilton–Jacobi equation
Phase space
Geodesics as Hamiltonian flows

References

 W.R. Hamilton, "On a General Method in Dynamics.", Philosophical Transactions of the Royal Society Part II (1834) pp. 247–308; Part I (1835) pp. 95–144. (From the collection Sir William Rowan Hamilton (1805–1865): Mathematical Papers edited by David R. Wilkins, School of Mathematics, Trinity College, Dublin 2, Ireland. (2000); also reviewed as On a General Method in Dynamics)
 Goldstein H. (1980) Classical Mechanics, 2nd ed., Addison Wesley, pp. 35–69.
 Landau LD and Lifshitz EM (1976) Mechanics, 3rd. ed., Pergamon Press.
 Arnold VI. (1989) Mathematical Methods of Classical Mechanics, 2nd ed., Springer Verlag, pp. 59–61.
 Cassel, Kevin W.: Variational Methods with Applications in Science and Engineering, Cambridge University Press, 2013.

Lagrangian mechanics
Calculus of variations
Principles
William Rowan Hamilton